Robert Peter Huff (born 25 December 1979) is a British professional racing driver. He currently competes in the World Touring Car Cup (WTCR) driving for Zengő Motorsport. He was the 2012 World Touring Car Championship champion and the 2020 Scandinavian Touring Car Championship champion.

Racing career

Early years
A Christmas Day birth in 1979 in Cambridge, Huff had a long junior career in karting. He attended St Faith's School and The Leys School, Cambridge, from 1993 to 1996. He won the 2000 Formula Vauxhall championship, and class B of the 2001 Ethyl MG Championship (also finishing as runner-up in this series in 2000). His father's Chartered Surveying firm has been one of his main sponsors.

British Touring Car Championship

Huff entered the big time by winning the inaugural SEAT Cupra Challenge in 2003, winning a paid drive in the British Touring Car Championship (BTCC) for the next season alongside former champion Jason Plato as a result. He battled on track with Plato in the second race at Thruxton but later lost his front splitter and retired, doing so again in the third race of the day. Huff started fifth at Brands Hatch and he was leading just before the safety car came out. He led away at the restart but was demoted to second by Matt Neal on the following lap and those position stuck until the end of the race, Huff claimed his first BTCC podium. He started round 8 at Silverstone on the reversed grid pole but second placed starter Kelvin Burt took the lead straight away and Huff soon fell victim to the Vauxhall of James Thompson. A collision with Michael Bentwood in the second race at Mondello Park meant Huff was disqualified and he started race three from the back. Huff eventually fell down to 7th place but he scored his second podium of the season in the third race. He claimed his first BTCC race win in round 24 at Brands Hatch and he repeated this success a fortnight later at Snetterton. He adjusted well, finishing 7th overall in the championship. In 2017, Huff made a return with Vauxhall at Silverstone as a step in for Tom Chilton after he got ruled out on medical grounds. He led for a majority of race 3, but eventually dropped behind Matt Neal late in the race and finished second, scoring the team's best result of the season.

World Touring Car Championship

Chevrolet (2005–2012)
The SEAT BTCC team was run by Ray Mallock in 2004, and when his company took on the fledgling Chevrolet WTCC project, they retained Huff. At the season opening Race of Italy, he finished ahead of his more experienced teammates Alain Menu and Nicola Larini in race one. He collided with the BMW of Antonio García in his home race at Silverstone, forcing him to retire. In what was a difficult season with the new car, Huff's best result of 2005 was a sixth place in Mexico and with it he took the first points for the Lacetti in the WTCC. He finished the year joint 20th with Stéphane Ortelli in the drivers' championship with only the three points scored in Mexico. That year he also did a one off in the guest car of the Porsche Carrera Cup GB, but collided with championship contender Tim Harvey in race one.

In 2006 he finished fourth at Brands Hatch, which was his best result of the first half of the season. He was taken to hospital after an accident at Puebla. At the following event at Brno in the Czech Republic, Huff started 24th due to two 10-place grid penalties, but he fought through to eighth place in the first race, which gave him pole for race 2 – giving him a lead he never relinquished en route to a first WTCC win, and the first for Chevrolet in the dry. However, the rest of the season was short on results, he finished 16th in the final standings.

There was an improvement in form once again from the Chevrolet team in 2007, Huff took a further win at the Scandinavian Raceway in Sweden, plus three more podiums, including his part in a Chevrolet 1–2–3 at Porto. These results ultimately left him ninth overall in the series, but behind team-mates Larini and Menu. The team took a win at every new circuit introduced for the 2007 season.

He opened 2008 with four pointless races, but came in first and second in the two races at Valencia. He was disqualified from the second race of the FIA WTCC Race of the Czech Republic due to his car having an illegal anti-roll bar linkage. At Brands Hatch he made his 100th WTCC start, qualifying third and taking the lead after a lap one collision between Menu and pole sitter Augusto Farfus. He led until a puncture three laps from the end. He finished the season third in the championship, behind SEAT drivers Yvan Muller and Gabriele Tarquini.

For 2009, Chevrolet switched to the Cruze chassis. Huff did not make the best of starts to the season, failing to progress through to Q2 at the Race of Brazil and scoring no points. It was not until the Race of Morocco when things picked up; Huff took pole position and won the first race to take his first points of the season and the first win for the Chevrolet Cruze. He qualified fifth at the Race of France but a good start meant he passed pole sitter Andy Priaulx and then Farfus on the second lap to take his second win of the season. Huff qualified on the front row for his home event, the Race of UK. He passed pole sitter Menu and led away from the restart after the safety car but was re-passed Menu, depriving Huff of a home win and putting him under pressure from the BMW of Priaulx. Huff qualified sixth for the Race of Germany but dropped to sixteenth on the grid after an engine change incurred a ten-place grid penalty. A first lap incident in the first race eliminated Huff along with Jörg Müller, Jordi Gené and Farfus. Gené caused an accident in the first race of the Race of Italy, making contact with Huff under braking who then made contact with SEAT of Rickard Rydell. Huff escaped any serious damage to hold onto third. He took pole position for the season finale at Macau and dominated the first race. Huff finished the season ranked fifth in the championship, ahead of teammates Alain Menu and Nicola Larini.

In 2010, he finished the championship third behind new teammate Yvan Muller and Tarquini.

The Chevrolet Cruze was the dominant car in 2011, winning all but three races. The Chevrolet drivers were in a title battle all of their own, with Huff leading the championship early in the season. Muller took the lead later on, taking the battle right down to the last event at Macau. Huff won both races but this was not enough to stop Muller taking the title, his second with Chevrolet and his third in total.

In 2012, Chevrolet announced this to be their last season in WTCC. The Chevy Cruze "blue train" with Huff, Yvan Muller and Alain Menu was again dominant over the field, taking 20 wins out of 24 races in the season. Muller took nine wins and led the championship for most of the season, Huff showed consistency and finished in the points for all the races except two. Finishing behind Muller did not seem enough until Muller tagged Menu from the lead in Shanghai, the penultimate round of the championship, sending Menu into a big slide and letting Huff through to overtake both of them and win the race. Menu lost a vital race win and Muller was given a penalty after the race, putting him out of the points altogether, giving Huff a big lead in the points. Menu was furious with Muller, saying "Yvan ruined both of their championships". In the final round in Macau, Huff was a clear favourite with a 37-point lead over Menu and 42 over Muller after qualifying on pole. In the first race though, drama unfolded. Huff lost the lead to Muller on lap one and overtook him on lap four to regain the lead but right after made a driving error and touched the barrier twice, forcing him to retire with damage. Muller won the race ahead of Menu, both reviving their chances for the championship. Huff's car got repaired for race two, with the help of both Menu's and Muller's crews in Chevrolet. Huff started the race eighth and had to finish fifth to secure the championship. On lap four, Yvan Muller ran into the back of Alex MacDowall's Chevrolet coming out of Mandarin, the fastest corner in the WTCC calendar, which spun MacDowall into the wall hard. The race was effectively finished with two safety car periods. Huff finished the race second behind Menu and ahead of Muller, with Chevrolet's campaign in World Touring Cars ending on another 1–2–3 finish for the team. Second place points were more than enough for Huff to win his first World Touring Car title and the first title for a British driver since Andy Priaulx in 2007.

Münnich Motorsport (2013)
Huff joined ALL-INKL.COM Münnich Motorsport in February 2013, driving one of the team's SEAT León WTCCs and replacing Markus Winkelhock in their line-up for the 2013 season. He failed to set a time in qualifying for the Race of Italy having collided with the Wiechers-Sport car of Fredy Barth in the first few minutes of Q1 and breaking his suspension. He was allowed to start the races from the back and climbed up to sixth place at the end of race one. His car received further attention prior to the start of race two and he started from the pit lane and finished tenth.

Lada Sport (2014–2015)
At the 2013 FIA WTCC Race of China it was announced Huff would join Lada Sport for the 2014 World Touring Car Championship season, having signed a two–year deal with the team.

Robert Huff was the driver who did not drive the dominating Citroën C-Elysée and who won the most numerous races in 2014 : two races, thanks to the inverted grid departure for the race 2 and a 60 kg lower compensation weight. In spite of these advantages, he proved thus his level of driving performances.

Lada introduced a new car for the 2015 WTCC season : the Lada Vesta, developed mainly by the French company Oreca.

Racing record

Complete British Touring Car Championship results
(key) (Races in bold indicate pole position – 1 point awarded in first race) (Races in italics indicate fastest lap – 1 point awarded all races) (* signifies that driver lead race for at least one lap – 1 point given all races)

Complete World Touring Car Championship results
(key) (Races in bold indicate pole position) (Races in italics indicate fastest lap)
{| class="wikitable" style="text-align:center; font-size:85%"
! Year
! Team
! Car
! 1
! 2
! 3
! 4
! 5
! 6
! 7
! 8
! 9
! 10
! 11
! 12
! 13
! 14
! 15
! 16
! 17
! 18
! 19
! 20
! 21
! 22
! 23
! 24
! DC
! Points
|-
| 2005
! Chevrolet
! Chevrolet Lacetti
|style="background:#cfcfff;"| ITA1
|style="background:#efcfff;"| ITA2
|style="background:#cfcfff;"| FRA1
|style="background:#cfcfff;"| FRA2
|style="background:#cfcfff;"| GBR1
|style="background:#efcfff;"| GBR2
|style="background:#cfcfff;"| SMR1
|style="background:#efcfff;"| SMR2
|style="background:#dfffdf;"| MEX1
|style="background:#efcfff;"| MEX2
|style="background:#cfcfff;"| BEL1
|style="background:#cfcfff;"| BEL2
|style="background:#cfcfff;"| GER1
|style="background:#cfcfff;"| GER2
|style="background:#cfcfff;"| TUR1
|style="background:#cfcfff;"| TUR2
|style="background:#efcfff;"| ESP1
|style="background:#ffffff;"| ESP2
|style="background:#efcfff;"| MAC1
|style="background:#efcfff;"| MAC2
| 
| 
|
|
! 21st
! 3
|-
| 2006
! Chevrolet
! Chevrolet Lacetti
|style="background:#cfcfff;"| ITA1
|style="background:#cfcfff;"| ITA2
|style="background:#cfcfff;"| FRA1
|style="background:#cfcfff;"| FRA2
|style="background:#dfffdf;"| GBR1
|style="background:#efcfff;"| GBR2
|style="background:#cfcfff;"| GER1
|style="background:#cfcfff;"| GER2
|style="background:#cfcfff;"| BRA1
|style="background:#dfffdf;"| BRA2
|style="background:#efcfff;"| MEX1
|style="background:#ffffff;"| MEX2
|style="background:#dfffdf;"| CZE1
|style="background:#ffffbf;"| CZE2
|style="background:#cfcfff;"| TUR1
|style="background:#dfffdf;"| TUR2
|style="background:#efcfff;"| ESP1
|style="background:#cfcfff;"| ESP2
|style="background:#cfcfff;"| MAC1
|style="background:#efcfff;"| MAC2
|
|
|
|
! 16th
! 20
|-
| 2007
! Chevrolet
! Chevrolet Lacetti
|style="background:#dfffdf;"| BRA1
|style="background:#efcfff;"| BRA2
|style="background:#efcfff;"| NED1
|style="background:#cfcfff;"| NED2
|style="background:#efcfff;"| ESP1
|style="background:#cfcfff;"| ESP2
|style="background:#dfffdf;"| FRA1
|style="background:#dfffdf;"| FRA2
|style="background:#cfcfff;"| CZE1
|style="background:#cfcfff;"| CZE2
|style="background:#dfdfdf;"| POR1
|style="background:#cfcfff;"| POR2
|style="background:#ffffbf;"| SWE1
|style="background:#cfcfff;"| SWE2
|style="background:#cfcfff;"| GER1
|style="background:#dfffdf;"| GER2
|style="background:#dfffdf;"| GBR1
|style="background:#ffdf9f;"| GBR2
|style="background:#dfffdf;"| ITA1
|style="background:#dfffdf;"| ITA2
|style="background:#ffdf9f;"| MAC1
|style="background:#efcfff;"| MAC2
|
|
! 9th
! 57
|-
| 2008
! Chevrolet
! Chevrolet Lacetti
|style="background:#efcfff;"| BRA1
|style="background:#efcfff;"| BRA2
|style="background:#cfcfff;"| MEX1
|style="background:#cfcfff;"| MEX2
|style="background:#ffffbf;"| ESP1
|style="background:#dfdfdf;"| ESP2
|style="background:#dfffdf;"| FRA1
|style="background:#dfffdf;"| FRA2
|style="background:#cfcfff;"| CZE1
|style="background:#000000; color:white"| CZE2
|style="background:#dfffdf;"| POR1
|style="background:#dfffdf;"| POR2
|style="background:#cfcfff;"| GBR1
|style="background:#cfcfff;"| GBR2
|style="background:#dfdfdf;"| GER1
|style="background:#ffdf9f;"| GER2
|style="background:#dfffdf;"| EUR1
|style="background:#ffdf9f;"| EUR2
|style="background:#dfffdf;"| ITA1
|style="background:#cfcfff;"| ITA226†
|style="background:#dfffdf;"| JPN1
|style="background:#dfffdf;"| JPN2
|style="background:#dfffdf;"| MAC1
|style="background:#ffffbf;"| MAC2
!style="background:#ffdf9f;"| 3rd
!style="background:#ffdf9f;"| 87
|-
| 2009
! Chevrolet
! Chevrolet Cruze LT
|style="background:#efcfff;"| BRA1
|style="background:#cfcfff;"| BRA2
|style="background:#cfcfff;"| MEX1
|style="background:#cfcfff;"| MEX2
|style="background:#ffffbf;"| MAR1
|style="background:#ffdf9f;"| MAR2
|style="background:#ffffbf;"| FRA1
|style="background:#ffdf9f;"| FRA2
|style="background:#cfcfff;"| ESP1
|style="background:#cfcfff;"| ESP2
|style="background:#efcfff;"| CZE1
|style="background:#cfcfff;"| CZE2
|style="background:#dfdfdf;"| POR1
|style="background:#dfffdf;"| POR2
|style="background:#dfdfdf;"| GBR1
|style="background:#dfffdf;"| GBR2
|style="background:#efcfff;"| GER1
|style="background:#cfcfff;"| GER1 
|style="background:#ffdf9f;"| ITA1
|style="background:#cfcfff;"| ITA2
|style="background:#ffdf9f;"| JPN1
|style="background:#dfffdf;"| JPN2
|style="background:#ffffbf;"| MAC1
|style="background:#dfffdf;"| MAC2
! 5th
! 80
|-
| 2010
! Chevrolet
! Chevrolet Cruze LT
|style="background:#dfdfdf;"| BRA1
|style="background:#dfffdf;"| BRA1|style="background:#dfdfdf;"| MAR1
|style="background:#efcfff;"| MAR2
|style="background:#ffdf9f;"| ITA1
|style="background:#ffdf9f;"| ITA2
|style="background:#dfffdf;"| BEL1
|style="background:#dfdfdf;"| BEL1
|style="background:#cfcfff;"| POR1
|style="background:#cfcfff;"| POR1
|style="background:#dfdfdf;"| GBR1
|style="background:#dfffdf;"| GBR2
|style="background:#ffffbf;"| CZE1|style="background:#dfffdf;"| CZE2
|style="background:#cfcfff;"| GER1
|style="background:#dfffdf;"| GER2
|style="background:#ffdf9f;"| ESP1
|style="background:#dfffdf;"| ESP2
|style="background:#ffffbf;"| JPN1
|style="background:#ffdf9f;"| JPN2
|style="background:#ffffbf;"| MAC1|style="background:#ffdf9f;"| MAC2
|
|
!style="background:#ffdf9f;"| 3rd
!style="background:#ffdf9f;"| 276
|-
| 2011
! Chevrolet
! Chevrolet Cruze 1.6T
|style="background:#ffffbf;"| BRA1|style="background:#dfffdf;"| BRA2
|style="background:#ffffbf;"| BEL1|style="background:#dfffdf;"| BEL2
|style="background:#ffffbf;"| ITA1|style="background:#ffffbf;"| ITA2
|style="background:#dfffdf;"| HUN1
|style="background:#dfdfdf;"| HUN2
|style="background:#ffffbf;"| CZE1
|style="background:#dfffdf;"| CZE2
|style="background:#ffdf9f;"| POR1
|style="background:#ffffbf;"| POR2
|style="background:#dfdfdf;"| GBR1
|style="background:#dfdfdf;"| GBR2
|style="background:#dfdfdf;"| GER1
|style="background:#dfffdf;"| GER2
|style="background:#dfffdf;"| ESP2
|style="background:#dfdfdf;"| ESP2
|style="background:#dfdfdf;"| JPN1
|style="background:#ffdf9f;"| JPN2
|style="background:#ffdf9f;"| CHN1
|style="background:#ffdf9f;"| CHN2|style="background:#ffffbf;"| MAC1|style="background:#ffffbf;"| MAC2
!style="background:#dfdfdf;"| 2nd
!style="background:#dfdfdf;"| 430
|-
| 2012
! Chevrolet
! Chevrolet Cruze 1.6T
|style="background:#dfdfdf;"| ITA1
|style="background:#ffdf9f;"| ITA2
|style="background:#dfffdf;"| ESP1
|style="background:#dfffdf;"| ESP2
|style="background:#dfdfdf;"| MAR1
|style="background:#dfdfdf;"| MAR2
|style="background:#cfcfff;"| SVK1
|style="background:#ffffbf;"| SVK2
|style="background:#dfdfdf;"| HUN1
|style="background:#dfffdf;"| HUN2
|style="background:#ffffbf;"| AUT1|style="background:#dfdfdf;"| AUT2
|style="background:#ffdf9f;"| POR1
|style="background:#dfffdf;"| POR2
|style="background:#ffdf9f;"| BRA1
|style="background:#ffffbf;"| BRA2
|style="background:#dfdfdf;"| USA1
|style="background:#ffffbf;"| USA2
|style="background:#ffdf9f;"| JPN1
|style="background:#dfffdf;"| JPN2
|style="background:#dfdfdf;"| CHN1
|style="background:#ffffbf;"| CHN2
|style="background:#EFCFFF;"| MAC1|style="background:#dfdfdf;"| MAC2
!style="background:#ffffbf;"| 1st
!style="background:#ffffbf;"| 413
|-
| 2013
! ALL-INKL.COM Münnich Motorsport
! SEAT León WTCC
|style="background:#dfffdf;"| ITA1
|style="background:#dfffdf;"| ITA2
|style="background:#dfffdf;"| MAR1
|style="background:#EFCFFF;"| MAR2
|style="background:#cfcfff;"| SVK1
|style="background:#dfffdf;"| SVK2
|style="background:#dfffdf;"| HUN1
|style="background:#ffffbf;"| HUN2
|style="background:#dfffdf;"| AUT1
|style="background:#dfffdf;"| AUT2
|style="background:#dfffdf;"| RUS1
|style="background:#FFDF9F;"| RUS2
|style="background:#dfffdf;"| POR1
|style="background:#dfdfdf;"| POR2
|style="background:#dfffdf;"| ARG1
|style="background:#EFCFFF;"| ARG2
|style="background:#dfffdf;"| USA1
|style="background:#cfcfff;"| USA2
|style="background:#dfffdf;"| JPN1
|style="background:#dfffdf;"| JPN2
|style="background:#dfffdf;"| CHN1
|style="background:#dfffdf;"| CHN2
|style="background:#FFDF9F;"| MAC1
|style="background:#ffffbf;"| MAC2
! 4th
! 215
|-
| 2014
! Lada Sport Lukoil
! Lada Granta 1.6T
|style="background:#EFCFFF;"| MAR1
|style="background:#EFCFFF;"| MAR2
|style="background:#DFFFDF;"| FRA1
|style="background:#CFCFFF;"| FRA2
|style="background:#CFCFFF;"| HUN1
|style="background:#CFCFFF;"| HUN2
|style="background:#DFFFDF;"| SVK1
|style="background:#FFFFFF;"| SVK2
|style="background:#CFCFFF;"| AUT1
|style="background:#EFCFFF;"| AUT2
|style="background:#DFFFDF;"| RUS1
|style="background:#EFCFFF;"| RUS2
|style="background:#CFCFFF;"| BEL1
|style="background:#CFCFFF;"| BEL2
|style="background:#DFFFDF;"| ARG1
|style="background:#DFDFDF;"| ARG2|style="background:#DFFFDF;"| BEI1
|style="background:#FFFFBF;"| BEI2|style="background:#CFCFFF;"| CHN1
|style="background:#EFCFFF;"| CHN2
|style="background:#CFCFFF;"| JPN1
|style="background:#CFCFFF;"| JPN2
|style="background:#DFFFDF;"| MAC1
|style="background:#ffffbf;"| MAC2
! 10th
! 93
|-
| 2015
! Lada Sport Rosneft
! Lada Vesta WTCC
|style="background:#EFCFFF;"| ARG1
|style="background:#EFCFFF;"| ARG2
|style="background:#DFFFDF;"| MAR1
|style="background:#EFCFFF;"| MAR2
|style="background:#DFFFDF;"| HUN1
|style="background:#EFCFFF;"| HUN2
|style="background:#EFCFFF;"| GER1
|style="background:#DFFFDF;"| GER2
|style="background:#DFFFDF;"| RUS1
|style="background:#DFDFDF;"| RUS2
|style="background:#DFFFDF;"| SVK1
|style="background:#EFCFFF;"| SVK2
|style="background:#EFCFFF;"| FRA1
|style="background:#FFFFFF;"| FRA2
|style="background:#DFFFDF;"| POR1
|style="background:#DFFFDF;"| POR2
|style="background:#DFFFDF;"| JPN1
|style="background:#FFDF9F;"| JPN2
|style="background:#EFCFFF;"| CHN1
|style="background:#DFFFDF;"| CHN2
|style="background:#DFFFDF;"| THA1
|style="background:#DFFFDF;"| THA2
|style="background:#CFCFFF;"| QAT1
|style="background:#EFCFFF;"| QAT2
! 10th
! 103
|-
| 2016
! Castrol Honda World Touring Car Team
! Honda Civic WTCC
|style="background:#FFFFBF;"| FRA1
|style="background:#DFFFDF;"| FRA2
|style="background:#FFDF9F;"| SVK1
|style="background:#CFCFFF;"| SVK2
|style="background:#DFFFDF;"| HUN1
|style="background:#DFFFDF;"| HUN2
|style="background:#000000; color:white"| MAR1
|style="background:#000000; color:white"| MAR2|style="background:#DFFFDF;"| GER1
|style="background:#DFFFDF;"| GER2
|style="background:#DFFFDF;"| RUS1
|style="background:#DFFFDF;"| RUS2
|style="background:#DFFFDF;"| POR1
|style="background:#DFFFDF;"| POR2
|style="background:#DFDFDF;"| ARG1
|style="background:#FFDF9F;"| ARG2
|style="background:#DFDFDF;"| JPN1
|style="background:#DFFFDF;"| JPN2
|style="background:#DFFFDF;"| CHN1
|style="background:#CFCFFF;"| CHN2
|style="background:#FFDF9F;"| QAT1
|style="background:#DFFFDF;"| QAT2
|
|
! 6th
! 199
|-
| 2017
! Münnich Motorsport
! Citroën C-Elysée WTCC
|style="background:#EFCFFF;"| MAR1
|style="background:#DFFFDF;"| MAR2
|style="background:#DFDFDF;"| ITA1
|style="background:#FFDF9F;"| ITA2
|style="background:#FFDF9F;"| HUN1
|style="background:#DFFFDF;"| HUN2|style="background:#FFDF9F;"| GER1
|style="background:#FFDF9F;"| GER2
|style="background:#DFFFDF;"| POR1
|style="background:#DFFFDF;"| POR2
|style="background:#DFFFDF;"| ARG1
|style="background:#DFFFDF;"| ARG2
|style="background:#EFCFFF;"| CHN1
|style="background:#CFCFFF;"| CHN2
|style="background:#DFFFDF;"| JPN1
|style="background:#CFCFFF;"| JPN2
|style="background:#DFFFDF;"| MAC1
|style="background:#FFFFBF;"| MAC2|style="background:#DFFFDF;"| QAT1
|style="background:#DFDFDF;"| QAT2
|
|
|
|
! 7th
! 215
|}
†Did not finish the race, but was classified as he completed over 90% of the race distance.

Complete TCR International Series results
(key) (Races in bold indicate pole position) (Races in italics indicate fastest lap)

Complete World Touring Car Cup results
(key) (Races in bold indicate pole position) (Races in italics indicate fastest lap)

† Driver did not finish the race, but was classified as he completed over 90% of the race distance.

Complete STCC TCR Scandinavia Touring Car Championship results
(key) (Races in bold indicate pole position) (Races in italics indicate fastest lap)

Complete TCR China Touring Car Championship results
(key) (Races in bold' indicate pole position) (Races in italics'' indicate fastest lap)

Britcar 24 Hour results

References

External links

 
 Profile at fiawtcc.com
 
 Robert Huff profile on Stapleford website where he was born and bred 

1979 births
Living people
English racing drivers
British Formula Renault 2.0 drivers
World Touring Car Champions
World Touring Car Championship drivers
British Touring Car Championship drivers
TC 2000 Championship drivers
Formula Palmer Audi drivers
BRDC Gold Star winners
24 Hours of Daytona drivers
WeatherTech SportsCar Championship drivers
Porsche Carrera Cup GB drivers
Britcar 24-hour drivers
World Touring Car Cup drivers
Ginetta GT4 Supercup drivers
Renault UK Clio Cup drivers
Sébastien Loeb Racing drivers
W Racing Team drivers
Nürburgring 24 Hours drivers
24H Series drivers
TCR Asia Series drivers
Volkswagen Motorsport drivers
Cupra Racing drivers
Zengő Motorsport drivers